In the theory of von Neumann algebras, a subfactor of a factor  is a subalgebra that is a factor and contains . The theory of subfactors led to the discovery of the 
Jones polynomial in knot theory.

Index of a subfactor

Usually  is taken to be a factor of type , so that it has a finite trace.
The index   of a subfactor  is defined to be . Here  is the representation 

Jones index theorem

All these values occur.

Basic construction

The GNS construction produces a Hilbert space   acted on by 
with a cyclic vector . Let  be the projection onto the subspace .

Jones tower
Suppose that  is an inclusion of type  factors of finite index. By iterating the basic construction we get a tower of inclusions

  

The union of all these algebras has a tracial state  whose restriction to each  is the tracial state, and so the closure of the union is another type  von Neumann algebra .

The algebra  contains a sequence of projections  which satisfy the Temperley–Lieb relations at parameter . Whenever these extra conditions are satisfied, the algebra is called a Temperly–Lieb–Jones algebra at parameter . It can be shown to be unique up to -isomorphism.

Standard invariant
Suppose that  is an inclusion of type  factors of finite index.

The standard invariant of the subfactor  is the following grid:

   
   
  
which is a complete invariant in the amenable case. A diagrammatic axiomatization of the standard invariant is given by the notion of planar algebra.

Principal graphs
A subfactor of finite index  is said to be irreducible if either of the following equivalent conditions is satisfied:

  is irreducible as an  bimodule;

In this case  defines a  bimodule  as well as its conjugate  bimodule .

The irreducible  and  bimodules arising in this way form the vertices of the principal graph, a bipartite graph.
The dual principal graph is defined in a similar way using  and  bimodules.

Since any bimodule corresponds to the commuting actions of two factors, each factor is contained in the commutant of the other and therefore defines a subfactor. When the bimodule is irreducible, its dimension is defined to be the square root of the index of this subfactor. The dimension is extended additively to direct sums of irreducible bimodules. It is multiplicative with respect to Connes fusion.

The subfactor is said to have finite depth if the principal graph and its dual are finite, i.e. if only finitely many irreducible bimodules occur in these decompositions.

where the  factors are obtained from the GNS construction with respect to the canonical trace.

Knot polynomials

The algebra generated by the elements  with the relations above is called the Temperley–Lieb algebra. This is a quotient of the group algebra of the braid group, so representations of the Temperley–Lieb algebra give representations of the braid group, which in turn often give invariants for knots.

References

 
Theory of Operator Algebras  III  by M. Takesaki  

Operator theory
Von Neumann algebras